John Parton Gabriel (1911-1941) was a male athlete who competed for England.

Athletics career
He competed in the 120 Yard Hurdles at the 1934 British Empire Games in London.

Personal life
He served as an Intelligence Officer in France and spoke fluent German, French and good Russian. He served as a Captain in the Royal Berkshire Regiment before being transferred to Special Operations Executive and special reconnaissance duty with GHQ Liaison Regiment. He died after the British steam merchant ship Jonathan Holt was sunk by U-97 en route from Liverpool to Takoradi.

References

1911 births
1941 deaths
British Special Operations Executive personnel
Military personnel from Surrey
English male hurdlers
Athletes (track and field) at the 1934 British Empire Games
Commonwealth Games competitors for England
Royal Berkshire Regiment officers
British Army personnel killed in World War II